Bram & Alice is an American sitcom that aired on CBS from October 6 to October 27, 2002. The series only aired four episodes, although an additional five unaired episodes were also produced.

Plot
The series centered on Bram Shepard, who won a Pulitzer Prize twenty years earlier for writing the best-selling novel Matthew Kent, and Alice O'Connor, who came to his door one day and informed him that she was his daughter, the result of a one-night stand he had when he was a guest lecturer at Vassar College.

Cast
Alfred Molina as Bram Shepard
Traylor Howard as Alice O'Connor
Roger Bart as Paul Newman
Katie Finneran as Katie
Michael Rispoli as Michael

Episodes

Broadcast and release
Universal HD aired all nine episodes of the series during the spring of 2010. The series has not been released on DVD.

References
 'Bram and Alice': Get me rewrite!, USA Today 
 'Bram': A Laughable Excuse for a Sitcom, The Washington Post

External links
 

CBS original programming
2002 American television series debuts
2002 American television series endings
2000s American sitcoms
Television series by CBS Studios
Television shows set in New York City